Pseudoctenis is a genus of fossil foliage attributable to the Cycadales. It is one of the most common genera of cycad fossil foliage in the Mesozoic.

Taxonomy
The genus was erected by Albert Seward based on material from the Jurassic of Sutherland. Although he did not publish a diagnosis for the genus, he noticed the similarity with the genus Ctenis, stating that the main difference between the two is the absence of anastomoses in Pseudoctenis.

References

Plants described in 1911
Cycads
Prehistoric gymnosperm genera